Charles Lee Herron (born April 21, 1937) was an American criminal who featured on the FBI Top Ten Wanted list. He was arrested in 1986 in connection with a 1968 shooting of two police officers.

References

1937 births
Possibly living people
FBI Ten Most Wanted Fugitives